Liga Deportiva Universitaria de Quito's 1985 season was the club's 55th year of existence, the 32nd year in professional football and the 25th in the top level of professional football in Ecuador.

Kits
Sponsor(s): Mutualista Pichincha

Competitions

Serie A

First stage

Results

References
RSSSF - 1985 Serie A

External links
Official Site 

1985